Submission (Swedish: Underkastelsen) is a 2010 Swedish documentary film directed by Stefan Jarl and narrated by Stellan Skarsgård. In the film, director Jarl has his blood drawn for a series of tests to show how much of a "chemical burden" is in his body.

Jarl convinces actress Eva Röse, who is pregnant, to have the blood tests also. The film goes on to describe the issue of chemicals and plastics invented since World War II and how they affect the health of people around the world.

The film had its North American premiere at the Mill Valley Film Festival on 15 October 2010.

External links

2010 films
Swedish documentary films
2010s German-language films
2010s English-language films
2010s Danish-language films
2010s Swedish-language films
2010 documentary films
Documentary films about environmental issues
Films directed by Stefan Jarl
2010 multilingual films
Swedish multilingual films
2010s Swedish films